Ellen Sinding (born Ellen Buttedahl; April 17, 1899 – April 18, 1980) was a Norwegian actress and dancer.

Sinding was born in Haugesund, the daughter of the actor and sculptor Sæbjørn Buttedahl and the actress Clare Petrea Margrethe Benelli (1871–1933). She debuted as an actress in 1922 in the film Kjærlighet paa pinde. During the 1920s, Sinding also appeared in the films Til sæters (1924), Den nye lensmannen (1926), and Fjeldeventyret and Syv dage for Elisabeth (both in 1927). In 1932 she appeared in Fantegutten, in 1933 in Jeppe på bjerget, and in 1936 in the short film Vi vil oss et land..., which was her last film role.

Sinding was married to the film director and journalist Leif Sinding.

Filmography
 1922: Kjærlighet paa pinde as Eva Sommer
 1924: Til sæters as Ragnhild
 1926: Den nye lensmannen as a dancer
 1927: Fjeldeventyret as Aagot, a mountain girl
 1927: Syv dage for Elisabeth as Lucie Breien
 1932: Fantegutten as Tatjana, a dancer
 1933: Jeppe på bjerget as the baron's girlfriend
 1936: Vi vil oss et land... as a dancer

References

External links
 
 Ellen Sinding at the Swedish Film Database

1899 births
1980 deaths
Norwegian female dancers
Norwegian film actresses
Norwegian silent film actresses
People from Haugesund
20th-century Norwegian actresses